Chania Lighthouse, is a lighthouse located at the entrance of the port of Chania, on the island of Crete, Greece. It was built in 1864 on the site of the original lighthouse by the Venetians. It has been a listed archeological site in Greece since 1962.

History 
Chania Lighthouse was originally a naval post created by the Venetians that would protect the city from oncoming Turks or pirates. In 1645, the Turks took control of the city, during which the lighthouse was left to ruins. Egyptian troops, who were aiding the Ottoman Empire in protecting Crete, rebuilt the lighthouse in 1864: only the base of the original lighthouse remains. In May 1915 a fixed white light was installed, marking it is an official lighthouse in Greece's network. The lighthouse suffered damage in World War II, and was refurbished in 2006.

Characteristics 
At the top there is a gallery and light that flashes red each 2.5 seconds.

References

External links 
 
 Chania Lighthouse at Faroi.com
 French postcard
 

Lighthouses completed in the 19th century
Lighthouses in Greece
Buildings and structures in Chania